David Matthew Kriete (born 1963) is a retired vice admiral in the United States Navy who last served as the deputy commander of the United States Fleet Forces Command. He is a graduate of the United States Naval Academy and holds a Master’s degree in Engineering Management from Old Dominion University.

Career

His flag assignments include deputy commander, United States Strategic Command (USSTRATCOM), Offutt Air Force Base, Nebraska; commander, Submarine Group 9 in Silverdale, Washington; deputy director, Plans and Policy, U.S. Strategic Command; and deputy director, Force Employment at U.S. Fleet Forces Command (USFF). He also served as director, Strategic Capabilities Policy, National Security Council where he was responsible for presidential policy on all nuclear weapons related issues.

His operational assignments include command of Submarine Squadron 6 and USS Rhode Island (SSBN 740). He also served aboard USS Kentucky (SSBN 737), USS Flying Fish (SSN 673) and USS Finback (SSN 670).

His shore and staff assignments include chief of staff, Submarine Force Atlantic; Navy Staff, Undersea Warfare Division; Submarine Force Atlantic Tactical Readiness Team and Prospective commanding officer instructor; Joint Staff Nuclear Operations Division; Atlantic Fleet Nuclear Propulsion Examining Board; and Submarine Force Atlantic Special Operations Division.

Kriete had an integral role in the last two Nuclear Posture Reviews. He assumed his latest duties as deputy commander, U.S. Fleet Forces Command May 4, 2020 where he also serves as deputy commander, Naval Forces Northern Command, deputy commander, Naval Forces Strategic Command, and commander Task Force 80. He was also dual-hatted as director Strategic Capabilities Policy, National Security Council.

He retired on July 1, 2021 after 37 years of distinguished service.

Awards and decorations

References

1963 births
Living people
United States Naval Academy alumni
Old Dominion University alumni
United States Navy admirals